Langakiai (formerly) is a village in Kėdainiai district municipality, in Kaunas County, in central Lithuania. According to the 2011 census, the village had a population of 196 people. There is a library, a medicine station, a farm.

During the Soviet era Langakiai was the "Oak" kolkhoz center.

Demography

References

Villages in Kaunas County
Kėdainiai District Municipality